Jack Skellington is a character and the main protagonist of the 1993 film The Nightmare Before Christmas. He is a Living Skeleton who is the Pumpkin King of Halloween Town, a fantasy world based solely on the Halloween holiday. Jack is voiced by Chris Sarandon. Danny Elfman provided Jack's singing voice in the original film and soundtrack album, with Sarandon providing Jack's speaking and singing voice in subsequent productions.

His overall appearance is a skeleton dressed in a black pin-striped suit and a bow tie that strongly resembles a bat. Originally, his suit was meant to be completely black, but it blended with the background too well, so it was changed. At the beginning of the film, Jack makes his grand entrance by emerging out of the fountain in Halloween Town's plaza. His last name is a play on the word "skeleton". He has a ghost dog named Zero for a pet, who has a small jack-o'-lantern for a nose. He is adored by Sally, a feminine creation of Doctor Finklestein. The character is a popular design on bags, hats, clothing, umbrellas, belt buckles, pet collars, and other items.

In The Nightmare Before Christmas

Jack Skellington is the patron spirit of Halloween, portrayed as being on par with Santa Claus and the Easter Bunny within his own holiday. As a living skeleton, he is supernatural and can remove parts of his body without harm, as is often demonstrated for comic relief. He is the most important of many Halloween spirits, with the implication that their job is to scare people in the real world on Halloween night.

Jack, as the "Pumpkin King" and master of ceremonies, is in charge of Halloween Town's Halloween celebration. He is loved, respected, and even idolized by the other residents for his role, but he has grown weary of celebrating the same holiday endlessly and is depressed about it. The only one who understands Jack's feelings is a lonely ragdoll named Sally. She overhears his singing monologue and feels she can relate to his situation.

One morning after the usual annual celebration, Jack enters a forest containing portals to other worlds themed around holidays. He discovers Christmas Town and decides that this new experience is what his life was missing. He makes preparations for his own Christmas celebration in Halloween Town and wants to impersonate Santa Claus in the real world. While his intentions are not malicious, Jack does not understand the true spirit of Christmas. Halloween Town plans to give the holidays a macabre makeover. Sally reveals to Jack a bad premonition, but Jack's basic nature is impulsiveness. He does not seem to register contradictory information. By the end of the film, he notices Sally and her determination to help him. He proves that love can be a part of his nature by calling Sally his "Dearest Friend", telling Sally that they were meant to be together, embracing his future with her and embracing her.

Jack follows the formula of a tragic hero because he begins the story at a lofty position. In spite of all his fame and talent, he yearns for another side of life. While a desire for completeness is not a flaw, his impulsiveness proves to be. He tends to be enthusiastic and inclusive, and his charisma is enough to sway every member of Halloween Town except Sally. His selfish decisions lead to the near destruction of Christmas and himself. The strength of Jack's character is demonstrated by his will to correct his own mistakes.

The official film soundtrack CD contains an epilogue not in the film, stating that "many years later" Santa returned to Halloween Town to visit Jack, where he discovered that Jack had "four or five skeleton children at hand" who play together in a xylophone band.

In video games

The Nightmare Before Christmas: The Pumpkin King

Jack Skellington has been shown to have an extreme hatred for Oogie Boogie as was proven when he spoke of this plan to Lock, Shock, and Barrel, stating to "leave that no account Oogie Boogie out of this!" He later finds out that Santa Claus and Sally have been kidnapped by the Boogie Man and are in his underground lair. While trying to save his friends, Jack manages to destroy Oogie and save Christmas.

The Nightmare Before Christmas: Oogie's Revenge

Tired of using the same old themes over and over on Halloween, Jack Skellington goes to Doctor Finkelstein, who gives him the Soul Robber, an invention that changes shape. Jack decided to leave Halloween Town to get new ideas for Halloween frights. When Jack comes back to town, he finds that Oogie Boogie has been resurrected. Now Jack has to set things right again. Jack dances, fights and sings in this game to attack Oogie Boogie's minions. Jack is portrayed as inept to some degree in this game.

Chris Sarandon did both the speaking and singing voice for Jack in this game.

Disney Universe

Jack Skellington features in the Nightmare Before Christmas downloadable expansion pack which includes Jack Skellington, Sally, Oogie-Boogie, Dr. Finklestein, and the Mayor as in-game playable costumes. The downloadable content can be bought from console stores (e.g. the PlayStation Store). The package included the costumes of which some could be found in the downloaded level. Unlike the worlds originally in the game which all had 3 chapters, the Nightmare Before Christmas world only had 1 chapter called 'Halloween Graveyard'.

Kingdom Hearts series

Jack Skellington appears in four installments of the Kingdom Hearts video game series. He inhabits the world of Halloween Town, where the evil Heartless threatens its denizens. The games' main protagonists, Sora, Donald Duck and Goofy, befriend Jack and together they battle the Heartless, and also Oogie Boogie. In combat, Jack uses some of his scary powers with demonstrations of some magic, making him a formidable sorcerer.

Chris Sarandon reprises his role for the English version, and Masachika Ichimura provides Jack's Japanese voice.

Kingdom Hearts

Jack Skellington introduces himself to Sora, Goofy, and Donald Duck as the ruler of Halloween Town. Jack plans to use the heart that Finklestein created to control the seemingly docile Heartless to make a festival called "Heartless Halloween" so that Halloween can be frightening, but the idea fails when not only the first experiment cause the Heartless to go berserk, but Oogie Boogie steals the finished heart, and plans to use it to take over Halloween Town. At Oogie's manor, Jack, Sora, and the gang confront him. After Oogie is defeated, Jack finds out that Oogie uses dark orbs as his source of life, which Oogie combines himself with his manor to become a giant boss. Once the gang defeats Oogie once again, and his manor crumbles, revealing Halloween Town's keyhole. Jack is considerably shorter in this game than as he appeared in the movie, though he is still rather tall when compared to the game's main protagonists.

Chain of Memories

"Created" from Sora's memories of Halloween Town, when Jack Skellington wanted to ask Doctor Finkelstein what happened when he sniffs the potion that can bring "true memories", Heartless appeared. When Jack Skellington had found out that Oogie Boogie had stolen Doc's potion, he must stop him before Oogie drinks the whole potion. They fail to reach him before he does, but they defeat him, as Oogie becomes overwhelmed with fear as a side effect of the potion. Sora becomes worried about what will happen when he discovers his true memories, but Jack reassures him that fear is a sign of a strong heart.

Kingdom Hearts 358/2 Days

In this game, Roxas arrives at Halloween Town while Jack is in the middle of brainstorming for Halloween. Jack is having trouble with thinking of things but gets inspiration when he sees Roxas leaving through a Dark Corridor. Time after time, Roxas' adventures through Halloween Town inspire Jack to create such things as balloons filled with spiders, exploding frost pumpkins, and Halloween lanterns. When Roxas is sent to find the source of a terrible drop in heartless population, he finds the town overrun with monsters called Tentaclaws. After seeing Roxas defeating the source of the Tentaclaws, the cannibalistic Leechgrave, Jack invents a terrifying scarecrowish version of Roxas as his centerpiece for that Halloween.

Kingdom Hearts II

Following the film loosely to some degree, out of reference, Jack tries to take Santa Claus's place again. To that end, Jack asks Sora and the gang to help him be Santa's bodyguards. But after fighting the Heartless and Oogie Boogie, who has been resurrected by Maleficent, Santa explains to Jack that they each have a job to do with their respective holidays. Despite this, he begins to wear a Santa suit Sally sewed together for him. In the second trip to Halloween Town, Jack still wears the Santa suit, as he still longs to deliver Christmas presents and feels that it would be rude not to wear the suit Sally worked so hard on. Along with Sora and the gang, he helps defeat Doctor Finkelstein's experiment, who stole Christmas presents from Santa in search of a heart. As a reward for all his hard work and assistance, Santa brings Jack on a ride-along with him in his sleigh for a while. After Santa drops Jack off at Halloween Town, Jack learns the true meaning of Christmas by understanding the act of giving. He dances with Sally in the end, finally realizing all of the gifts she had given to him were all from the heart and wishes to give her something in return. She tells him that the nicest present she could ever ask for is just to be with Jack. Jack responds telling her that she does not even have to ask for that, meaning Jack feels the same way for her. During a cut scene in the end credits, he is shown to be wearing his original suit, suggesting he has taken Santa's previous advice to heart completely, and apparently begins presenting new ideas for next Halloween.

Disney Infinity
In the Disney Infinity video game series, Jack appears as part of the second wave of playable characters. He has the ability to scare enemies and throw exploding jack-o'-lanterns. If he rides Ghost Rider's motorcycle, his head will catch on fire, resembling 
Ghost Rider's flaming head.

Attractions
Jack appears as a meetable character at several Walt Disney Parks and Resorts including Disneyland, Hong Kong Disneyland, Disneyland Paris and Walt Disney World, and is located outside The Haunted Mansion in Frontierland. Disneyland during the holidays, Haunted Mansion is taken over by the cast of The Nightmare Before Christmas and is turned into Haunted Mansion Holiday. Jack and other characters appear throughout the ride wearing Christmas attire. Additionally, Jack hosts the Halloween Screams and Not So Spooky Spectacular! fireworks shows, as well as the Frightfully Fun Parade. Chris Sarandon reprised the voice for the character in each instance.

Cameos 
 In Vincent, a figure similar to Jack appears as one of the phantasmic imaginisms of the titular character, during the final minutes of the short film.
 In Beetlejuice, during the seance scene, when Betelgeuse rises out of the table he is wearing a carousel adorned with a skull that resembles what would later be the design of Jack.
 During the opening scene of Sleepy Hollow, a scarecrow bearing a strong resemblance to the Pumpkin King scarecrow at the beginning of "This is Halloween" can be seen.
 In the 2010 film Alice in Wonderland, Jack's face can be found on the Mad Hatter's bow tie.
 In James and the Giant Peach, Jack makes a cameo as Captain Jack, an antagonist second to Aunt Sponge and Aunt Spiker, in the pirate scene. Upon discovering him, Centipede says "A Skellington?".
 A silhouette of Jack is shown in The Princess and the Frog as one of the shadows Dr. Facilier summons.
 Jack Skellington's face made a cameo appearance on a doormat in the first volume of the graphic novel series Lenore, created by Roman Dirge.
 Jack appears in an episode of The Critic in a short parody called "The Nightmare Before Hanukkah", done in the same stop-motion animation style as the original movie. In this parody, Jack wears a red suit rather than his usual black and white striped one.
 Jack also appears in the animated Adult Swim sketch show Robot Chicken. In one sketch, film critic Roger Ebert and filmmaker M. Night Shyamalan review a batch of sequels to popular movies. One of which is The Nightmare Before Hanukkah, with Jack finding a place called "Hanukkah Town" and watches children open up presents, but finding out that it is just socks and pencils for their first day of Hanukkah, leading to Jack saying to himself: "Oh, wow, this sucks..." Jack appears again on another sketch called "Grown-Up Halloween" alongside the Mayor of Halloween Town.
 Jack appears in the background in a South Park made-for-TV movie called "Imaginationland".
 Jack appears in the movie Coraline as the yolk of an egg cracked by the Other Mother.
 Jack appears in the Mad episode "Kitchen Nightmares Before Christmas". He also makes a cameo appearance in the short it was paired with, "How I Met Your Mummy".
 A parody of Jack Skellington, in the form of a character named The Pumpkin Guy, appears in the opening of the Tiny Toon Adventures episode "Night Ghoulery".
 Jack appears, along with his Halloween Town friends, in one of the cutaway scenes of the Family Guy episode "Peter's Sister". In the scene, a fictional Nightmare sequel entitled Happy 4th of July Jack Skellington, the citizens of Halloween Town sing a short song called "Patriotic Weirdness".
 A Jack plush doll also made an appearance in Stocking's room in the anime Panty and Stocking.
 Jack is included as one of many characters featured in Disney on Ice's production Let's Celebrate!. Mickey Mouse calls upon him to throw a Halloween party, which a number of Disney Villains find their way into. During his appearance, a medley of "Jack's Lament" and "What's This?" are performed, along with the film's opening number "This Is Halloween". Sarandon provided both the speaking and singing for Jack.
 In the PlayStation and Nintendo 64 video game Gex 3: Deep Cover Gecko, the titular character references the main plot of The Nightmare Before Christmas from the point of view of Jack in the winter/Christmas-themed level, "Christmas Land" as he remarks "Christmas Town? I'm Jack Gexington from Halloween..."
 In an episode of the children's show Tumble Leaf when they are on an adventure to the spider queen's Halloween party. Fig(main character) and friends stop at a neighbors home. On the door of the neighbors home, which is in a tree, it's shaped like the doors in the opening scene of nightmare before Christmas. On the door, Jack and Sally's beloved, iconic spiral mountain peak.
 Some figures of Jack appear on a pavilion in Oh My Disney in the film Ralph Breaks the Internet.

Toys
Jack Skellington has been made into a Bendies figure, as well as various Funko Pop Vinyl figurines with different variants, such as a Day of the Dead variant. He appeared in the Kingdom Hearts action figure collections, and was also released in Japan's REVOLTECH Sci-fi line in 2010, along with the Japanese monsters, Gamera and Gyaos. Diamond Select Toys also made many action figures of Jack and other characters.

In 2017 a life-size Jack Skellington animatronic prop was released. The prop was six feet tall and sold exclusively at Spirit Halloween. But in 2019 the prop became a wholesale item.

In the Disney Infinity toys-to-life series, Jack appears as part of the second wave of playable figurines.

In 2019, a Lego minifigure of Jack Skellington was released as part of the Lego Minifigures Disney Series 2. A Lego Brickheadz figure of Jack was also released alongside a Brickheadz version of Sally.

Reception
Despite the film not being a part of the Disney Animated Canon, Jack has nonetheless become one of Disney's most popular characters. Jamie Frater adds, "Jack is perfectly realized as the 'town hero' who seeks more in his life (or death, as it may be), a place we all find ourselves time to time." UGO Networks listed Jack as one of their best heroes of all time.

References

Animated characters introduced in 1993
Christmas characters
Disney animated characters
Disney characters originating in film
Fictional kings
Fictional skeletons
Fictional zombies and revenants
Film characters introduced in 1993
Male characters in animated films
Male characters in film
Santa Claus
Stop motion characters
The Nightmare Before Christmas
Characters created by Tim Burton